Guy Elmour (died 5 June 2012) is a New Caledonian professional football manager.

Career
Since 1971 until 1973 coached the New Caledonia national football team. From 1977 he worked over 25 year as the New Caledonian Football Federation President.

5 June 2012 Guy Elmour died.

References

External links

Year of birth missing
2012 deaths
New Caledonian football managers
New Caledonia national football team managers
Place of birth missing